Arvi may refer to:
 Arvi, Wardha, a city in the Wardha district of Maharashtra, India
 Arvi (Vidhan Sabha constituency)

 An ancient Hebrew word for inhabitants of Arabia; see Etymology of the word Arab
 Arvi (given name)